Capitalism is a 1991 outdoor marble and concrete sculpture and fountain by Larry Kirkland, located in northeast Portland, Oregon, United States.

Description
Larry Kirkland's Capitalism (1991) is an outdoor marble and concrete sculpture and fountain installed at the corner of Northeast 9th Avenue and Northeast Multnomah Street by the Lloyd Center. It was chosen in a regional art competition during Lloyd Center's renovation. The sculpture depicts fifty coins stacked on an Ionic column and is set in the center of a circular fountain basin with four water jets. Half of the coins have serious or humorous inscriptions on their edges relating to capitalism and commerce.

It was surveyed and considered "treatment needed" by the Smithsonian Institution's "Save Outdoor Sculpture!" program in July 1993. It has been included in published walking tours and public art guides, one of which called the sculpture "an appropriate reminder of the relationship of money to a marketplace".

See also

 1991 in art
 Fountains in Portland, Oregon

References

1991 establishments in Oregon
1991 sculptures
Allegorical sculptures in Oregon
Concrete sculptures in Oregon
Fountains in Portland, Oregon
Lloyd District, Portland, Oregon
Marble sculptures in Oregon
Northeast Portland, Oregon
Outdoor sculptures in Portland, Oregon
Works about capitalism